Rustam Sohrabji Sidhwa (1 September 1927 – 31 March 1997) was a former judge on the Supreme Court of Pakistan as well as one of the original eleven judges of the International Criminal Tribunal for the former Yugoslavia.

Career

Pakistan
He passed the Bar in 1951 and was elevated to a judge of the Lahore High Court in 1978. Between 14 December 1989 and 31 August 1992, he served on the Supreme Court of Pakistan.

International Criminal Tribunal for the Former Yugoslavia
Sidhwa served as a judge in the Appeals Chamber of the International Criminal Tribunal for the Former Yugoslavia from 1993 until his resignation in July 1996 for health reasons. He then returned to Pakistan.

Works 
Justice Sidhwa was also a keen philatelist and wrote a catalogue. He wrote a book as well.

 The Lahore High Court and Its Principal Bar, Pakistan Times Press, Lahore, 1967
 Sidhwa's Catalogue, Pakistan stamps, errors & varieties, 1947–78, Kermin, Lahore 1978

References

External links
 International Criminal Tribunal for Former Yugoslavia

1927 births
1997 deaths
Pakistani judges
Parsi people
Pakistani Zoroastrians
Pakistani philatelists
International Criminal Tribunal for the former Yugoslavia judges
Supreme Court of Pakistan
Pakistani judges of United Nations courts and tribunals